Anonymous Christian is the controversial notion concerning the fate of the unlearned which was introduced by the Jesuit theologian Karl Rahner (1904–1984) that declares that people who have never heard the Christian Gospel might be saved through Christ. Non-Christians could have "in [their] basic orientation and fundamental decision," Rahner wrote, "accepted the salvific grace of God, through Christ, although [they] may never have heard of the Christian revelation."

The theologians W. D. Davies and Dale Allison wrote that proponents of the notion find scriptural support in Romans 2:14–16, as well as in Matthew 25:31–46.

The notion of inclusivism, for which Rahner's Anonymous Christian is the principal Christian model, is "perhaps the most popular of interreligious postures."

Karl Rahner
Karl Rahner accepted the notion that without Christ it was impossible to achieve salvation, but he could not accept the notion that people who have never heard of Jesus would be condemned.
"Anonymous Christianity" means that a person lives in the grace of God and attains salvation outside of explicitly constituted Christianity. A Protestant Christian is, of course, "no anonymous Christian"; that is perfectly clear. But, let us say, a Buddhist monk (or anyone else I might suppose) who, because he follows his conscience, attains salvation and lives in the grace of God; of him I must say that he is an anonymous Christian; if not, I would have to presuppose that there is a genuine path to salvation that really attains that goal, but that simply has nothing to do with Jesus Christ. But I cannot do that. And so if I hold if everyone depends upon Jesus Christ for salvation, and if at the same time I hold that many live in the world who have not expressly recognized Jesus Christ, then there remains in my opinion nothing else but to take up this postulate of an anonymous Christianity.
According to Rahner, a person could "intellectually profess disbelief but [be] existentially ... committed to those values which for the Christian are concretized in God."

Vatican II
Karl Rahner's concept of Anonymous Christian was one of the most influential theological ideals to affect the Second Vatican Council.

Criticism
The Anonymous Christian theory has been widely criticized. After becoming Pope Benedict XVI Ratzinger refined his own position on the theory:

"Lately several attempts have been formulated in order to reconcile the universal necessity of the Christian faith with the opportunity to save oneself without it.
... the well-known thesis of the anonymous Christians of Karl Rahner... sustains that the basic, essential act at the basis of Christian existence, decisive for salvation, in the transcendental structure of our consciousness, consists in the opening to the entirely Other, toward unity with God.
The Christian faith would in this view cause to rise to consciousness what is structural in man as such. So when a man accepts himself in his essential being, he fulfills the essence of being a Christian without knowing what it is in a conceptual way.
The Christian, therefore, coincides with the human and, in this sense, every man who accepts himself is a Christian even if he does not know it.
It is true that this theory is fascinating, but it reduces Christianity itself to a pure conscious presentation of what a human being is in himself and therefore overlooks the drama of change and renewal that is central to Christianity.
Even less acceptable is the solution proposed by the pluralistic theories of religion, for which all religions, each in their own way, would be ways of salvation and in this sense, in their effects must be considered equivalent.
The critique of religion of the kind exercised in the Old Testament, in the New Testament and in the early Church is essentially more realistic, more concrete and true in its examination of the various religions. Such a simplistic reception is not proportional to the magnitude of the issue."

Some Catholic groups, such as the Society of St. Pius X, have long battled against the rise of liberalism and modernism in the Catholic Church and have criticized the Anonymous Christian theory saying, "is a very grave doctrinal error because it declares personal justification as being already realized for every man without any participation of his will or free choice and, so, without any need of his conversion, faith, baptism or works. Redemption is guaranteed to all, as if sanctifying grace were ontologically present in each man just because he is man."

Conservative Protestant Christians generally believe that the notion of Anonymous Christian explicitly contradicts the teachings of Saint Peter, Paul the Apostle, and other apostles. For example, Acts 4:12, "there is salvation in no one else; for there is no other name under heaven that has been given among men, by which we must be saved." This group of Christians believes in "Christian exclusivism—the view that biblical Christianity is true, and that other religious systems are false."

Liberal Christians condemn the notion because, as Rev. Hans Küng put it, "It would be impossible to find anywhere in the world a sincere Jew, Muslim or atheist who would not regard the assertion that he is an 'anonymous Christian' as presumptuous". Religious pluralist John Hick states that this notion is paternalistic because it is "honorary status granted unilaterally to people who have not expressed any desire for it." Küng further stated that the Anonymous Christian theory is a 'theological fabrication' that merely gives face-saving lip-service to the Catholic dogma Extra Ecclesiam nulla salus. It is, says Küng sarcastically, "an elegant gesture which sweeps the whole of good-willed humanity into the backdoor of the holy Roman Church." Hick also rejects the notion because the majority of people are born into non-Christian families. Anonymous Christianity, per this group, denigrates the beliefs of others by supposing that they are really Christians without realizing it.

See also

 Baptism of desire
 Virtuous pagan
 Extra Ecclesiam nulla salus § Protestant interpretation
 Similar concepts in Judaism are described at

Notes

References

Citations

Bibliography

Further reading

Catholic theology and doctrine
Salvation in Catholicism